Sibongiseni Dhlomo (born 10 December 1959) is a South African politician and medical doctor for the African National Congress. Dhlomo is the current deputy minister of health for the Republic of South Africa.

Early life 
Dhlomo was born in Umbumbulu in the South African province of KwaZulu-Natal. He attended Dlangezwa High School on an Illovo Sugar Mill bursary, where he met his wife, Nono MaDlamini.

Education 
He studied medicine at the University of Natal from 1980 to 1985, and later achieved a Bachelor of Arts degree from the University of South Africa while incarcerated at Robben Island, majoring in psychology and sociology, and attained master's degree in public health from MEDUNSA. He also has a diploma in forensic pathology.

Career 
Dhlomo served in the South African National Defence Force, where he was bestowed a rank of a brigadier general.

He was the deputy city manager responsible for health and social services in the eThekwini Metro Municipality.

He was a chairperson of the eThekwini ANC Region and a regional treasurer of Emalahleni ANC Region for two terms.

Provincial health 
Dhlomo became provincial executive member in KwaZulu-Natal and became the MEC of health in 2009, and faced such criticism for his handling of the portfolio throughout his term that the Health and Other Service Personnel Trade Union of South Africa (HOSPERSA) wanted Dhlomo to be sacked for presiding "over a department that is perpetually in a state of mismanagement and corruption".

Under Dhlomo's direction, the provincial health department in 2010 opened two cases of fraud against Tecmed, the company responsible for servicing and maintaining radiotherapy machines in KwaZulu-Natal, but the company was never charged. It was alleged that Tecmed had fraudulently obtained its contract with the department. In 2013, during the continuing contract dispute involving these allegations, Dhlomo ordered payments to Tecmed to be halted. As a result, the company disabled the radiotherapy machines and cancer patients could not receive treatment for ten months. It was only after an expose on the TV program Carte Blanche that the dispute was resolved and the machines were made functional again.

Dhlomo was accused of overseeing a "cancer crisis" in the province. In June 2017, KwaZulu-Natal premier Willies Mchunu announced that the provincial treasury had taken over administration and procurement at the provincial health department. In May 2018, as a result of a complaint laid with the SAHRC by the opposition Democratic Alliance (DA), Dhlomo appeared before the commission to account for the province's poor healthcare and his role in violating the human rights of oncology patients at the Addington and Inkosi Albert Luthuli Central Hospitals to have access to health care services. The DA's Mbali Ntuli called for his firing over the failure.

In 2015, it came to light that the provincial Department of Health had rented a mobile clinic at a cost of R60 million over 3 years, when it would have been cheaper to outright buy and own such a clinic.

National health 
Dhlomo was the chairperson of the Parliamentary Health Portfolio Committee.

On 6 August 2021, after former Deputy Joe Phaahla was promoted to head the Department of Health, Sibongiseni Dhlomo took his place as Deputy Minister of Health.

Politics 
Dhlomo supports the NHI Bill that seeks to nationalise all healthcare in South Africa, and the establishment of a state-owned pharmaceutical company.

References 

African National Congress politicians
1959 births
Living people
Members of the National Assembly of South Africa